The Serbia national badminton team represents Serbia in international badminton team competitions. The Badminton Association of Serbia organizes any event or national event in the national team. The men's and women's team participate in the European meet.

The Serbian team also competes in the Mediterranean Games.

Participation in European Junior Badminton Championships
Mixed Team

Participation in Mediterranean Games

List of medalists

Current squad 

Men
Vanja Bokan
Igor Jovanović
Aleksandar Jovičić
Marko Mihajlović
Uglješa Mihajlović
Viktor Petrović
Vanja Rašeta
Mihajilo Vig

Women
Maša Aleksić
Nina Bogdanović
Andrea Bogojević
Miona Filipović
Teodora Latas
Sanja Peric
Marija Samardžija
Andjela Vitman

References

Badminton
National badminton teams
Badminton in Serbia